Shi Zhonggui is a Chinese painter, philosopher and poet born in 1954 in Chengdu, Sichuan.

Shi Zhonggui's paintings in Chinese ink and colour on rice paper evoke the vast expanses of Western China. His paintings have a sense of both freedom and tranquillity.

Biography
At 16 he became a professional painter. 
In 1978 he studied traditional Chinese painting at the Sichuan Academy of Fine Arts. At this time he was also writing poetry and published a number of books.

In 1994 the Sichuan Museum nominated Shi Zhonggui as one of its official artists and in 1996 he was appointed Professor at the College of Arts at Sichuan University. Since 1999, when he had his first exhibitions in Paris and Geneva, Shi Zhonggui's work has also been well received in Europe. In 2000 he was made a Member of the Academie des Arts-Sciences-Lettres de France and won the 2000 Grande Medaille de Vermeil, the first Chinese artist ever to win this award.

Exhibitions
 1973 – Hangzhou, China
 1992 – Bangkok, Thailand
 1993 – Guangzhou, China, First Art Fair of China
 1995 – Tokyo, Japan, Ginza Art Gallery
 1996 – Taipei, Taiwan, Jixianin Art Center
 1997 – Taichung, Taiwan, Dingfeng Art Gallery
 1998 – Singapour, Tiandu Gallery
 1999 – Paris, France,	Galerie Kalliste 21
 1999 – Geneva, Switzerland,	Galerie l'Ancre Bleue
 2000 – Barcelona, Spain
 2000 – London, UK, Bloxham Galleries
 2001 – Geneva, Switzerland,	Galerie l'Ancre Bleue
 2001 – Londres, UK, Bloxham Galleries
 2002 – Tourgeville, France,	Galerie de Tourgeville
 2002 – Hamburg, Germany, Tecis Gallery
 2003 – Paris, France, Galerie Kalliste 21
 2004 – Paris, France,	Chart Galerie
 2005 – Paris, France,	Galerie Art Contemporain
 2005 – Geneva, Switzerland,	Galerie l'Ancre Bleue
 2006 – Chengdu, China, Sichuan Art Museum
 2007 – Beijing, China, 798 Art Zone
 2009 – Geneva, Switzerland,	Galerie l'Ancre Bleue
 2010 – Los Angeles, CA, Bamboo Lane
 2010 – Hunan, China, Hunan Provincial Painting Academy
 2014 – Geneva, Switzerland, Galerie l'Ancre Bleue
 2015 – Taipei, ARKI GALÉRIA
 2018 – Geneva, Galerie l'Ancre Bleue

References

External links
 

1954 births
Painters from Sichuan
People's Republic of China philosophers
People's Republic of China poets
Date of birth missing (living people)
Living people
Artists from Chengdu
Writers from Chengdu
Philosophers from Sichuan
Poets from Sichuan